Judge Underwood may refer to:

Emory Marvin Underwood (1877–1960), judge of the United States District Court for the Northern District of Georgia
John Curtiss Underwood (1809–1873), judge of the United States District Courts for the District of Virginia and the Eastern District of Virginia
Mell G. Underwood (1892–1972), judge of the United States District Court for the Southern District of Ohio

See also
Justice Underwood (disambiguation)